Schistura paucifasciata is a species of ray-finned fish, a stone loach, in the genus Schistura. This species is known only from Hwe-gna-sang River in the Hsipaw State, in the northern Shan States of Myanmar and has not been recorded since the type was collected. It is a benthic species which is found in hill streams with cool, flowing water.

References

P
Fish described in 1929